Håkon Lie can refer to:

Haakon Lie (1905–2009), Norwegian politician
Håkon Wium Lie (born 1965), Norwegian technologist
Haakon Lie (forester) (1884–1970), Norwegian forester and writer